The Turkestan sculpin (Cottus spinulosus) is a species of freshwater ray-finned fish belonging to the family Cottidae, the typical sculpins.. It is found in the basin of the upper Syr Darya River. It reaches a maximum length of 10.3 cm

References

Cottus (fish)
Fish described in 1872